Castell'Alfero is a comune (municipality) in the Province of Asti in the Italian region Piedmont, located about  east of Turin and about  north of Asti.

Castell'Alfero borders the following municipalities: Asti, Calliano, Corsione, Cossombrato, Frinco, Tonco, and Villa San Secondo.

Twin towns — sister cities
Castell'Alfero is twinned with:

  Lafrançaise, France

References

External links
 Official website

Cities and towns in Piedmont